General elections were held in British Honduras on 28 April 1954, the first held under universal suffrage. The new constitution replaced the Legislative Council with a Legislative Assembly, which had nine elected members, three officials and three appointed members. The result was a decisive victory for the pro-independence People's United Party, which won eight of the nine seats in a coalition with the General Workers' Union.

The pro-colonial National Party won the remaining seat, with NP candidate Charles Westby prevailing in the Toledo constituency.

Results

By division

References

British Honduras
General elections in Belize
1954 in British Honduras
British Honduras
British Honduras